Thomas Farriner ( – 20 December 1670) was a British baker and churchwarden in 17th century London. Allegedly, his bakery in Pudding Lane was the source point for the Great Fire of London on 2 September 1666.

Career 
Farriner joined the Baker's Company in 1637, and had his own shop by 1649. By the time of the Great Fire of London, Thomas Farriner was a well-known baker in the City of London, who provided bread for the Royal Navy during the Anglo-Dutch war.

Great Fire of London 

In the early hours of 2 September 1666, Farriner was awakened by smoke coming under the door of his bedroom. Downstairs in his bakery in Pudding Lane, the fire had started and his house had caught fire. Farriner, with his daughter, managed to escape out of an upstairs window. His maid, however, wasn't so lucky. She refused to follow them out of the window because she was frightened of falling into the street. She eventually died in the fire and was the first victim of the Great Fire of London.

 
 

After the fire, he rebuilt his business in Pudding Lane. He and his children signed the Bill falsely accusing Frenchman Robert Hubert of starting the fire.

Farriner died in 1670, aged 54–55, slightly over four years after the  Great Fire of London.

In popular culture
Thomas Farriner and his daughter are featured characters in the 2016 musical Bumblescratch.

Andrew Buchan played Farriner in the 2014 TV series The Great Fire (TV series).

See also 

Great Fire of London

Pudding Lane

References

Further reading
 

Place of birth unknown
Year of birth unknown
1670 deaths
1610s births
1615 births
17th-century births